Saint Lietbertus (Lietbert, Libert, Liberat) of Brakel (or of Cambrai, de Lessines) (ca. 1010–1076) was bishop of Cambrai from 31 March 1051 to 28 September 1076.  Liebertus was born to the Brabantian nobility at Opbrakel (a village in the present-day municipality of  Brakel).  He served as archdeacon and provost of the cathedral of Cambrai before his election as bishop.

Pilgrimage
As bishop of Cambrai, he attempted a pilgrimage to the Holy Land in 1054 with some of his flock ("people of all ages and both sexes"), but did not reach it.  He did, however, manage to cross the Danube, entering what is biographer calls "Pannonia" and met the king of Hungary, Andrew I, who promised to give the pilgrims protection as they passed through his lands.  Lietbertus' party encountered dangers as it passed through Bulgaria, Dalmatia, Isauria, arriving at Corinth.  At Corinth, Lietbertus visited the tomb of Saint Demetrius.

According to his biography, Lietbertus got as far as Cyprus:

After his pilgrimage
He founded the abbey of Saint-Sépulcre (Holy Sepulchre) in 1064.

He defended Cambrai against Robert I, Count of Flanders, and excommunicated the castellan of Cambrai, Hugh I of Oisy, for which he got into conflict with the German Emperor.

Biography
About the life and realisations of bishop Lietbertus two sources are available:
 Gesta Lietberti episcopi, written in two phases:
 phase 1, covering the period 1051–1054, probably by the continuator of the Gesta episcoporum Cameracensium
 phase 2, covering the period 1055–1076.
 Vita sancti Lietberti, written by Rodulfus, a monk of the abbey of Saint-Sépulcre. Edition: Vita Lietberti episcopi Cameracensis auctore Rudulfo monacho S. Sepuchri Cameracensis, HOFMEISTER A. ed., MGH Scriptores 30-2 (Leipzig 1926, 1934) 838–868.

Notes

External links
Saints of June 23: Liebertus of Cambrai
Raoul of Saint-Sépulcre, The Life of St. Lietbertus, Bishop of Cambrai

1076 deaths
Bishops of Cambrai
11th-century Christian saints
Medieval French saints
Year of birth unknown